This article describes the qualification for the 2020 European Women's Handball Championship.

The qualification was cancelled due to the COVID-19 pandemic.

Qualification system 
31 teams registered for participation and competed for 14 places at the final tournament in two distinct Qualification Phases. The group winner of phase 1 advanced to phase 2. The 28 teams were divided into seven groups of four teams.

Qualification Phase 1 
The group was played in a tournament format from 31 May to 2 June 2019. The group winner advanced to the second phase.

All times are local.

Standings

Results

Qualification Phase 2 
The groups would have been played in a home and away round-robin format from September 2019 to May 2020. The top two teams would have been qualified for the main tournament.

The draw was held on 4 April 2019.

The European Handball Federation announced on 13 March 2020 that the matches from 25 to 29 March would not be held as scheduled due to the ongoing developments in the spread of COVID-19 across Europe.

On 25 March, the EHF announced that no matches would be played before June due to the coronavirus pandemic. The rounds 3 to 6 would have been played in a single venue in one week. Those rounds were cancelled on 24 April 2020.

Seeding 

All times are local.

Group 1

Group 2

Group 3

Group 4

Group 5

Group 6

Group 7

References

External links
Eurohandball.com

Qualification
Europe Women's Championship qualification
European Women's Handball Championship, qualification, 2020